Juan Gabriel Rodríguez (born 28 February 1994) is an Argentine professional footballer who plays as a centre-back for Rosario Central, on loan from Defensa y Justicia.

Career

Club
Rodríguez began in Club El Recreo's youth, prior to joining River Plate. He departed in 2016 to join Primera B Metropolitana's Fénix, making his pro debut in a 5–1 home win over UAI Urquiza on 8 February. That was the first of forty-nine appearances for Fénix over the course of his first two seasons. In August 2017, Almagro of Primera B Nacional loaned Rodríguez. He scored once, versus Juventud Unida in the following April, in twenty-one fixtures in all competitions while with the club. On 13 June 2018, Rodríguez joined Argentine Primera División side San Martín on loan. His first match was a Copa Argentina loss to Brown on 21 July.

International
While with River Plate, Rodríguez received a call-up from the Argentina U17s for the 2011 FIFA U-17 World Cup in Mexico. He failed to make an appearance over four games as Argentina were eliminated by England in the round of sixteen.

Career statistics
.

References

External links

1994 births
Living people
Sportspeople from Mendoza Province
Argentine footballers
Argentina youth international footballers
Association football defenders
Primera B Metropolitana players
Primera Nacional players
Argentine Primera División players
Club Atlético Fénix players
Club Almagro players
San Martín de San Juan footballers
Defensa y Justicia footballers
Rosario Central footballers